The London Environmental Education Forum was set up in 1989 as a membership organisation to promote and champion the delivery of environmental education (EE) across Greater London, England.

The forum's members work across the sector, taking in frontline teaching roles to backroom policy and everything in-between. Its members share information through an online discussion group and a regular newsletter.

LEEF organises workshops and seminars to enhance member's skills, spread best practices and provide networking opportunities. LEEF advertises job vacancies and promotes events linked with EE delivery.

Membership is open to individuals and organisations interested or actively involved in EE in the Greater London area.

Education in London
Environmental education in England

Website http://www.leef.org.uk/